Sandqvist is a Swedish surname. Notable people with the surname include:

Albin Sandqvist, Swedish singer also known by the mononym Albin
Alf Sandqvist (born 1945), Swedish Army major general
Jonas Sandqvist (born 1981), Swedish footballer

Swedish-language surnames